The Grand Slam is an accomplishment recognized by various professional wrestling promotions in the United States and Japan. It is a distinction given to a professional wrestler who has won four specific championships within a promotion throughout the course of their career. Promotions that recognize this include WWE (since 1997), Impact Wrestling (since 2009), Ring of Honor (since 2018) and New Japan Pro-Wrestling (since 2021). The four titles typically include three singles championships, one of them usually being a world title, plus a tag team championship.

National promotions

WWE (1997) 

In WWE (formerly WWF), the term "Grand Slam" was originally used by Shawn Michaels to describe himself upon winning the European Championship on September 20, 1997. Michaels previously held the WWF Championship, Intercontinental Championship, and the World Tag Team Championship—the titles that composed the Triple Crown.

In May 2001, the promotion's website indicated that the Hardcore Championship was an acceptable substitute for the European Championship in the Grand Slam. Kane, who had defeated Triple H for the Intercontinental Championship at Judgment Day on May 20, 2001, was acknowledged as a Grand Slam winner as he had "become the only superstar in World Wrestling Federation history that has held the Intercontinental title as well as the Hardcore, Tag Team and WWF titles".

In April 2006, Kurt Angle was noted as being a former Grand Slam winner on WWE.com, having won the WWE, WWE Tag Team, Intercontinental, and European Championship, indicating that WWE considered the WWE Tag Team Championship to be an acceptable substitute for the World Tag Team Championship. In August 2007, WWE.com published an article listing Shawn Michaels' championship reigns that completed the Grand Slam. They included the WWE, World Heavyweight, World Tag Team, Intercontinental, and European Championship. The inclusion of the World Heavyweight Championship indicated that WWE considered the title to be an acceptable substitute for the WWE Championship in completing the Grand Slam.

At ECW One Night Stand in June 2006, Rob Van Dam became the first superstar acquired by WWE after the purchase of World Championship Wrestling and Extreme Championship Wrestling in 2001 to complete the Grand Slam when he defeated John Cena for the WWE Championship. Booker T became the second star acquired by the purchase to complete the Grand Slam when he defeated Rey Mysterio for the World Heavyweight Championship at The Great American Bash in July 2006. Booker has held the World Tag Team, Intercontinental, and Hardcore titles.

Following WrestleMania 31 in 2015, WWE (which four years earlier ended the brand extension and unified several titles before that) established an updated version of the Grand Slam consisting of the four then-active men's titles in WWE: the WWE World, Intercontinental, United States, and WWE Tag Team Championships. Thirteen wrestlers have been recognized as Grand Slam winners under these new parameters (including five who were already recognized as Grand Slam winners under the original guidelines). The brand extension was re-established in 2016 and WWE indicated that two new championships that had been introduced, the Universal Championship and the SmackDown Tag Team Championship, count as acceptable substitutes for their counterpart titles (WWE Championship and WWE Tag Team, now Raw Tag Team, respectively) as part of the Grand Slam.

Chris Jericho completed the original format the fastest, completing it in 728 days between December 1999 and December 2001, while Kurt Angle completed the modern format the fastest, completing it in 966 days between February 2000 and October 2002. 

On February 21, 2021, WWE acknowledged The Miz as the first wrestler to complete the Grand Slam twice under the revised 2015 format after winning his second WWE Championship. Seth Rollins would become the second two-time Grand Slam Champion by winning the WWE United States Championship a second time in October 2022. Triple H, Chris Jericho and Christian have each completed the original Grand Slam format twice, while Jeff Hardy has completed it three times, although it is unknown if WWE officially recognises these achievements.

List of WWE Grand Slam winners 

Original format (established 1997)

Revised format (established 2015)

The modern WWE Grand Slam - as shown above on Daniel Bryan - consists of (from left to right) the WWE, Intercontinental, United States, and WWE (now Raw) Tag Team Championships.  Two other championships - the Universal and SmackDown Tag Team Championship - were added in 2016 as alternative titles to the WWE and WWE/Raw Tag Team Championships respectively following the reintroduction of the brand extension. In regards to the United States Champion, due to its lineage, WWE only counts United States Championship reigns that took place in WWE, whether it bore the WCW or WWE moniker. Edge and Kurt Angle held the title when it was the WCW United States Championship. Eddie Guerrero’s second reign only counts as a result of this rule.

Women's format (established 2019) 
 
In May 2019, Bayley (above) was announced as WWE's first-ever Women's Grand Slam champion, having won (from left to right) the Raw, SmackDown, and NXT singles championships, and the WWE tag team championship.

Impact Wrestling (2009) 

The first Impact Wrestling Grand Slam winner, then known as the Total Nonstop Action Wrestling (TNA) Grand Slam, was crowned on March 15, 2009, at TNA's Destination X pay-per-view event. At said event, then three-time TNA Triple Crown champion A.J. Styles defeated Booker T for the TNA Legends Championship. On the March 19 episode of TNA's primary television program, TNA Impact!, announcer Mike Tenay stated that Styles had become the first TNA Grand Slam winner by capturing the World Heavyweight (NWA or TNA), World Tag Team (NWA or TNA), X Division, and Legends Championships (The Legends Championship was subsequently renamed the Global, Television, and King of the Mountain Championship, before being fully retired).

Under TNA's definition of the Grand Slam, wrestlers are eligible to be a multiple Grand Slam winner each time they complete a new circuit. Thus far, only A.J. Styles has won the Grand Slam on more than one occasion. On August 15, 2016, the TNA King of the Mountain Championship was once again retired when Lashley unified the title into his TNA World Heavyweight Championship. In a March 26, 2018, article on the Impact Wrestling website, the eligibility of the Impact Grand Championship, which replaced the King of the Mountain Championship, as a Grand Slam title was confirmed. Since 2018, any future Grand Slam winners are limited to those who had already held either the Legends/Global/TV/King of the Mountain title or Grand Championship, as during a press conference on June 4, 2018, Austin Aries unified the Impact Grand Championship with the Impact world title.

List of Impact Wrestling Grand Slam winners

Ring of Honor (2018) 

In 2018, Ring of Honor (ROH) established its own version of the Grand Slam, which consists of the ROH World Championship, ROH World Television Championship, ROH World Tag Team Championship, and ROH World Six-Man Tag Team Championship.  Christopher Daniels was the first wrestler to achieve this feat, doing so at the ROH 16th Anniversary Show, when he won the Six-Man titles to complete the Grand Slam.  After Jay Lethal won the ROH World Tag Team Championship, he was announced as a Grand Slam Champion since he had won the ROH Pure Championship in the past, indicating that the Pure and Six-Man Tag Team Titles are interchangeable as the fourth component to the ROH Grand Slam.

List of ROH Grand Slam winners

New Japan Pro-Wrestling (2021) 

In 2021, New Japan Pro-Wrestling retroactively established its own version of the Grand Slam, occasionally also referred to as the Quadruple Crown, consisting of the IWGP Heavyweight Championship, the IWGP United States Heavyweight Championship, the IWGP Intercontinental Championship and the NEVER Openweight Championship. The NJPW Grand Slam is unique in Grand Slams as it consists of four singles championships. Jay White was the first to achieve this feat, completing the circuit on May 3, 2021 at Wrestling Dontaku 2021.

It is currently unknown if another NJPW Grand Slam will be established, as both the IWGP Heavyweight and Intercontinental titles were retired in 2021 in favor of the IWGP World Heavyweight Championship.

List of NJPW Grand Slam winners

Regional/independent promotions

Florida Championship Wrestling (2012) 

In Florida Championship Wrestling (FCW), WWE's former developmental territory, a Grand Slam winner was a wrestler who had won every championship that was available in FCW. All FCW titles were retired when FCW changed its name to NXT.

List of FCW Grand Slam winners

Ice Ribbon (2012) 
In the joshi puroresu (women's professional wrestling) promotion Ice Ribbon, the Grand Slam consists of the ICE×60/ICE×∞ Championship, the International Ribbon Tag Team Championship, the  Triangle Ribbon Championship and the IW19 Championship.

List of Ice Ribbon Grand Slam winners

World Wonder Ring Stardom (2022) 
In the joshi puroresu (women's professional wrestling) promotion World Wonder Ring Stardom, the Grand Slam consists of all the available titles promoted by the company except the Future of Stardom Championship. They are the World of Stardom Championship, the Wonder of Stardom Championship, the Goddess of Stardom Championship, the Artist of Stardom Championship, the High Speed Championship and the SWA World Championship. The notion of "grand slam" was first officially mentioned on May 5, 2022, when Mayu Iwatani became the second wrestler in the company to achieve the feat, after Io Shirai.

List of World Wonder Ring Stardom Grand Slam winners

Explosive Pro Wrestling (2018) 
In Explosive Pro Wrestling (EPW), the Grand Slam consists of the EPW Heavyweight Championship, the EPW Tag Team Championship, the EPW Coastal Championship and the EPW Hardcore Championship.

List of Explosive Pro Wrestling Grand Slam winners

References 

Professional wrestling slang
Professional wrestling accomplishments